(Overprotected Kahoko) is a 2017 Japanese television drama, starring Mitsuki Takahata, Ryoma Takeuchi, Hitomi Kuroki and Saburō Tokitō. It aired on every Wednesday at 22:00 (JST) on NTV from July 12 to September 13, 2017.

Cast 
 Mitsuki Takahata as Kahoko Nemoto
 Hitomi Kuroki as Izumi Nemoto
 Saburō Tokitō as Masataka Nemoto
 Ryoma Takeuchi as Hajime Mugino
 Tokuma Nishioka as Fukushi Namiki
 Yoshiko Mita as Shodai Namiki		
 Mari Nishio as Takashi Namiki	
 Atom Shukugawa as Atsushi Namiki	
 Hiroko Nakajima as Tamaki Namiki	
 Jiro Sato as Mamoru Namiki
 Sayu Kubota as Ito Namiki	
 Masayo Umezawa as Tae Nemoto	
 Sei Hiraizumi as Masaoki Nemoto	
 Mari Hamada as Noriko Nemoto

References

External links
  
 

Japanese drama television series
2017 Japanese television series debuts
2017 Japanese television series endings
Nippon TV dramas